"Blue Yodel no. 8, Mule Skinner Blues" (a.k.a. "Muleskinner Blues", and "Muleskinner's Blues") is a classic country song written by Jimmie Rodgers. The song was first recorded by Rodgers in 1930 and has been recorded by many artists since then, acquiring the de facto title "Mule Skinner Blues" after Rodgers named it "Blue Yodel #8" (one of his Blue Yodels).

"George Vaughn", a pseudonym for songwriter George Vaughn Horton, is sometimes listed as co-author. Horton wrote the lyrics for "New Mule Skinner Blues", Bill Monroe's second recorded version of the song.

Structure
The song tells the tale of a down-on-his-luck mule skinner, approaching "the Captain", looking for work ("Good Morning, Captain." / "Good morning, Shine." / "Do you need another muleskinner on your new mud line?"). He boasts of his skills: "I can pop my 'nitials on a mule's behind" and hopes for "a dollar and a half a day".  He directs the water boy to "bring some water round". The term "Mule Skinner", slang for muleteer, is a driver of mules, and has nothing to do with removing the animal's hide.

Tom Dickson's "Labor Blues" 
The first verse the song is similar to Tom Dickson's 1928 recording "Labor Blues" in which the exchange is clearly between a white boss and an African-American worker who is quitting the job, not applying for it:

It’s "good mornin’ Captain", ‘e said "good mornin’ Shine",
Said "good mornin’ Captain", said "good mornin’ Shine".
"T’ain’t nuthin’ the matter, Captain, but I just ain’t gwine.

"I don’t mind workin’, Captain, from sun to sun,
I don’t mind workin’, Captain, from sun to sun.
But I want my money, Captain, when pay-day come."

"Captain" was a traditional term for the white boss; "Shine" is a derogatory expression for "African-American". Dickson was black. After the narrator rebels and quits because he is not being paid, he turns his attention to his "Mississippi gal" and the remaining lyrics concern their romance.  In this 12-bar blues recording, muleskinning is not mentioned, and the remaining Dickson lyrics differ from Rodgers', whose other Blue Yodels also used verses previously recorded by Blues musicians, such as Blind Lemon Jefferson.

Versions of "Muleskinner Blues"

1930s
Rodgers' original version was a hit.
Roy Acuff recorded the song in 1939; his version was released in 1940.
Bill Monroe performed the song for his November 25, 1939 debut on the Grand Ole Opry. The performance can be found on the MCA compilation  Music of Bill Monroe From 1936-1994 (1994).

1940s
 The song was Monroe's first solo studio recording. Recorded on October 7, 1940, for RCA Victor, the song became a hit and one of Monroe's signature tunes.
Woody Guthrie recorded the song in 1944 for Asch Recordings, which can be found on Muleskinner Blues: The Asch Recordings, Vol. 2, and on Original Folk: Best of Woody Guthrie (Music Club Deluxe, 2008).

1950s
Monroe re-recorded the song in 1950 as "New Mule Skinner Blues" in his first session for Decca, with new lyrics written by George Vaughn Horton (credited as "George Vaughn"). Monroe apparently never sang the song with Horton's lyrics in concert.
Odetta - Odetta Sings Ballads and Blues (1956)
Lonnie Donegan - Lonnie Donegan Live, 1957 []
Ramblin' Jack Elliott - Jack Takes the Floor (1958)
Joe D.  Gibson (Jody Gibson) recorded a souped up version titled "Good Morning Captain" on tetra Records which served as a model for The Fendermen.

1960s
The Fendermen - Mule Skinner Blues (Soma Records, 1960)  This Madison, Wisconsin-based duo reached #5 on the Billboard charts with their version, featuring abbreviated lyrics and strong Fender electric guitar instrumentation. This version is arguably the most widely circulated of recent versions of the song, due to its Billboard chart performance and its subsequent prolific appearances on novelty song collections. 
Harry Belafonte performed his rendition as "Muleskinner" on track seven of his Midnight Special album released in 1962.
Bob Dylan made this song part of his live performance at the Finjan Club, Montreal, Canada in July 1962.
Grandpa Jones - "Muleskinner Blues" recorded some point in the 60's.
David Wiffen - David Wiffen At The Bunkhouse Coffeehouse, Vancouver BC (1965)
The Wildwood Boys, a bluegrass band featuring Jerry Garcia, Robert Hunter and David Nelson, played the song as part of their live repertoire in 1963.
Jose Feliciano - "Mule Skinner Blues" (RCA Victor Records, 1964)
The Streaplers - "Mule Skinner Blues" 1964 (Swedish group)
 A novelty version of the song, "Batskinner" by Robin & The Batmen (Sara 6612, 1966), was inspired by both The Fendermen version of "Mule Skinner Blues" and the popular Batman television series. ("Good morning, Commissioner!")
 Merle Haggard - Same Train, a Different Time (1969)

1970s

Ramblin' Jack Elliott - Johnny Cash Show (1971) Ramblin' Jack Elliott, Norman Blake and Randy Scruggs on The Johnny Cash Show, January 6, 1971.
Dolly Parton - The Best Of Dolly Parton (1970) This 1970 recording of the song reached #3 on the U.S. country charts, and earned Parton a Grammy nomination. (Parton and Bill Monroe would later perform the song together on the 1978 CBS television special Fifty Years of Country Music.)
Jerry Reed - Georgia Sunshine (1971) Chet Atkins plays on the right channel and takes one guitar solo.
Stompin' Tom Connors - Live at the Horseshoe (1971)
Flash Cadillac & the Continental Kids - Flash Cadillac & the Continental Kids, Released as "		Muleskinner Blues (Blue Yodel No. 8)" (1972)
Don McLean - Playin' Favorites (1973)
Don McLean - Solo (1976)
 Kingfish - Live N Kickin (1977)
Rose Maddox w/Mark O'Connor (lead gtr) & Jeff Thorn - (1978) http://picosong.com/4kF/
Levi's used a variation of this song for its blue jeans commercial using stop motion animation, around 1972. Lyrics included:  "Good Morning, World! Good Morning to you! I'm Wearing my Levi's, Le-hee-hee-hee-vis!" 
Muleskinner - Muleskinner (1973) This bluegrass supergroup were named after and led off their only studio album with the song.
Old & In the Way - Breakdown (recorded 1973, released 1997)
Dennis Bruderer - (1977) 45rpm on Little Richie #1032 b/w "Shake Hands With A Fool"

1980s
Tony Rice - Cold On The Shoulder (1984)
The Cramps - Stay Sick (1989)
The Brothers Four - Released as "Muleskinner" on the compilation album Folk Classics: Roots of American Folk Music (Columbia Records, 1989). This version is arranged by Stuart Gotz; it primarily uses a western show tune style and includes some bluegrass-like elements.

1990s
The Cramps - Stay Sick! (1990)
Van Morrison - How Long Has This Been Going On (1996) (2009 CD reissue bonus track)

2000s
Van Morrison - The Skiffle Sessions (2000) and Live at Austin City Limits Festival (2007)
Scott H. Biram - The Dirty Old One Man Band (2005)
Rhonda Vincent - Ragin' Live (Rounder, 2005)

2010s
Marcus Singletary - Sings Country Music Standards (2013)
 Melinda Schneider and Beccy Cole covered the song on their album Great Women of Country (2014).
Cluster Sisters - Cluster Sisters (Som Livre, 2015)
Sore Points recorded and performed the song on X-Files SE11E03 (2018)

Charting versions

References

Songs about occupations
1930 songs
1931 singles
1941 singles
Jimmie Rodgers songs
Dolly Parton songs
Odetta songs
Lonnie Donegan songs
The Fendermen songs
Woody Guthrie songs
Van Morrison songs
RCA Records singles
Songs written by George Vaughn Horton
Songs written by Jimmie Rodgers